Styger is a surname. Notable people with the surname include:

Johan Styger (born 1962), South African rugby union player
Nadia Styger (born 1978), Swiss alpine ski racer